Eau Claire is a village located in east central Berrien County in the U.S. state of Michigan.  The population was 625 at the 2010 census.

The village lies partially within Pipestone Township and partially within Berrien Charter Township.

Geography

History
Eau Claire was established in 1861. The community took its name from a nearby creek which was observed to have clear water; "eau claire" is French for "clear water".

Demographics

2010 census
As of the census of 2010, there were 625 people, 214 households, and 157 families living in the village. The racial makeup of the village was 82.6% White, 5.1% African American, 1.4% Native American, 7.2% from other races, and 3.7% from two or more races. Hispanic or Latino of any race were 13.9% of the population.

There were 214 households, of which 44.4% had children under the age of 18 living with them, 49.1% were married couples living together, 16.8% had a female householder with no husband present, 7.5% had a male householder with no wife present, and 26.6% were non-families. 21.0% of all households were made up of individuals, and 7.4% had someone living alone who was 65 years of age or older. The average household size was 2.92 and the average family size was 3.41.

The median age in the village was 31.2 years. 30.7% of residents were under the age of 18; 11.6% were between the ages of 18 and 24; 24.2% were from 25 to 44; 24.7% were from 45 to 64; and 9% were 65 years of age or older. The gender makeup of the village was 48.3% male and 51.7% female.

2000 census
As of the census of 2000, there were 656 people, 227 households, and 170 families living in the village. The racial makeup of the village was 91.31% White, 3.05% African American, 1.52% Native American, 0.15% Asian, 1.98% from other races, and 1.98% from two or more races. Hispanic or Latino of any race were 8.08% of the population.

There were 227 households, out of which 43.6% had children under the age of 18 living with them, 54.2% were married couples living together, 13.2% had a female householder with no husband present, and 25.1% were non-families. 19.8% of all households were made up of individuals, and 7.0% had someone living alone who was 65 years of age or older.  The average household size was 2.88 and the average family size was 3.22.

In the village, the population was spread out, with 32.5% under the age of 18, 8.5% from 18 to 24, 34.8% from 25 to 44, 15.5% from 45 to 64, and 8.7% who were 65 years of age or older.  The median age was 30 years. For every 100 females, there were 101.8 males.  For every 100 females age 18 and over, there were 104.1 males.

The median income for a household in the village was $38,750, and the median income for a family was $41,477. Males had a median income of $28,295 versus $20,852 for females. The per capita income for the village was $15,668.  About 8.4% of families and 10.3% of the population were below the poverty line, including 8.6% of those under age 18 and 3.0% of those age 65 or over.

High school

Eau Claire High School has an enrollment of around 194 students.

References

Notes

Sources

Villages in Berrien County, Michigan
Villages in Michigan